Line 3 of the Chengdu Metro runs in a northeast-southwest direction from  Chengdu Medical College to Shuangliu West Station. Line 3's color is magenta. Phase 1 of this line began construction on 28 April 2012, and opened on 31 July 2016.

Opening timeline

Stations

See also

 Chengdu Metro
 Urban rail transit in China

References

Chengdu Metro lines
Railway lines opened in 2016
2016 establishments in China